The Iron Corporal is a fictional character appearing in comic books. He was first as a recurring character in Charlton Comics' war comics line, and briefly in his own comic book titled The Iron Corporal. His first appearance was in Army War Heroes #22 in 1967.

The stories, all written by Willi Franz and drawn by Sam Glanzman (except one story penciled and inked by Charles Nicholas and by Vince Alascia), revolved around Ian Heath, an American corporal fighting with the Australian Army in the Southwest Pacific during World War II. The Iron Corporal's back story includes having his ribs augmented with an iron-steel bracing manufactured by his steel industrialist father. The stories are only loosely connected and depict the struggles of infantrymen in war.

Bibliography 
 Army War Heroes #22–38 (Nov. 1967 – June 1970)
 Iron Corporal #23-25 (Oct. 1985 - Feb. 1986) — reprints of earlier stories

References

Further reading 

Charlton Comics characters
Charlton Comics titles
Comics characters introduced in 1967
Fictional corporals
Fictional World War II veterans
War comics
Comics set during World War II